John Calvin McCoy (September 28, 1811September 2, 1889) is considered the "father of Kansas City".

Early life
McCoy was born in Vincennes, Indiana.  He studied as a land surveyor at Transylvania College in Lexington, Kentucky, during 1826-1827.  He accompanied his parents Isaac and Christiana (Polk) McCoy to Kansas City to perform Baptist missionary work in 1830.

Career
In 1833, John McCoy built a two-story cabin at what is today 444 Westport Road on the northeast corner of Pennsylvania Avenue.  He opened a store for travelers on the Santa Fe and Oregon trails.  He named the area Westport because it was the last settlement before travelers ventured into the Territory of Kansas.

McCoy's store was four miles from the Missouri River in the hills away from the floodplain. He established a dock at a rocky point in the river between Main and Grand Street, which came to be called Westport Landing.  He followed a trail that was to become Broadway to reach it.

The natural wharf became quite popular but the land surrounding it belonged to Gabriel Prudhomme, a farmer. After Prudhomme was murdered in 1831, his property was auctioned in 1838 to settle the estate. Fourteen people, including McCoy, bought the property by forming the Town of Kansas Company after the French description of the area around the town, chez les Canses ("home of the Kansa" Indians). He platted it into 318 lots for sale. In 1853, when the town was officially charted by the state of Missouri, the English pronunciation of the French name was applied to the new "City of Kansas", which later became known as Kansas City.

Due to his sympathies with the Confederate States of America during the American Civil War, he was required to leave Kansas City by General Order No. 11 of 1863.

Personal life
John married Virginia Christiana Chick (December 20, 1820 – April 28, 1849) on January 23, 1838. She was the daughter of William Miles Chick (August 31, 1794 in Virginia – April 7, 1847 in Kansas City, MO) and Ann Eliza Smith (1796 in Virginia – 1876 in Kansas City, MO). The McCoys had several children: Josephus (December 6, 1838 – September 2, 1843), Eleanor (December 2, 1840 – ?), Juliette (February 16, 1842 – ?), Spencer Cone (July 25, 1844 – January 8, 1863 in Springfield, Missouri as a Confederate soldier), William Chick (February 21, 1846 – May 12, 1848), and Virginia (August 22, 1848 – ?).

Death
He was buried in Union Cemetery.

Legacy
A Kansas City Public Library historian said McCoy "single-handedly had the greatest effect on the development of early Kansas City". He is widely regarded as "the father of Kansas City". Pioneer Park is at Westport and Broadway, with a sculpture by Thomas L. Beard of Alexander Majors, John McCoy, and Jim Bridger.

References

External links
"John Calvin McCoy", University of Missouri, Kansas City resources
Experience Kansas City history

1811 births
1889 deaths
People from Vincennes, Indiana
Transylvania University alumni
People from Kansas City, Missouri